B-boying or Breaking, also called Breakdancing, is a style of street dance that originated among African-American and Puerto Rican youths in New York City during the early 1970s. The dance spread worldwide due to popularity in the media, especially in regions such as South Korea, United Kingdom, Germany, France, Russia, and Japan. Now, b-boying has gained much popularity around the world with countless competitions crowning the best bboy crews and solo bboys. Many consider Battle of the Year, The Notorious IBE, UK B-Boy Championships and R-16 Korea to be the 4 major international bboy competitions which determine the best bboy crew in the world. Along with crew battles, solo, or 1 on 1 battles, have also gained much popularity around the world. UK B-Boy Championships, Battle of the Year and R-16 Korea are also well known for their 1 on 1 b-boy championships. However, Red Bull BC One is argued to be the most coveted competition to crown the best solo b-boy due to their audience and popularity worldwide.

International Solo B-boy Champions list
In 2014 the most renowned international solo Breaking competitions joined together in the creation of the Undisputed World BBoy Series and a masters event called Undisputed Masters to determine the supreme individual Breaking champion. The events included in the Undipsuted World B-Boy Series are UK B-Boy Championships, Battle of the Year, R-16 Korea, Notorious IBE, Silverback Open Championships, Freestyle Session, Chelles Battle Pro, Outbreak Europe, Taipei BBoy City, Green Panda Festival and Legits Blast Winter. Former events for Undisputed include Red Bull BC One.

Success by country
Note: The following table only takes into consideration Red Bull BC One, Battle of the Year, UK B-Boy Championships and R-16 Korea as well as other Undisputed events.

Undisputed

The World B-Boy Series is the world's first B-Boying competition connecting eight different events around the world. Since 2014, the 8 solo B-Boy champions of these international events will meet in a new masters event called Undisputed and battle to establish who is the supreme champion, who is "Undisputed".

Undisputed Champions list

World BBoy Series 2015
Events participating in the 2015 World BBoy Series.
Freestyle Session / Pro Breaking Tour, USA
Battle of the Year, Braunschweig, Germany
R-16 Korea, South Korea
Silverback Open Championships / Pro Breaking Tour, Philadelphia, USA
The Notorious IBE, The Netherlands
Outbreak Europe, Slovakia
Chelles Battle Pro, Chelles, France
Red Bull BC One World Finals, Rome, Italy

To qualify to Undisputed, b-boys had to win 1 of the 8 World B-Boy Series events. In the event that one b-boy won multiple championships, the next highest ranked b-boy would qualify.
 Victor Silverback Open Championships, Freestyle Session and Red Bull BC One winner
 Menno R-16 Korea and Battle of the Year winner
 Mounir Chelles Battle Pro winner
 Kleju qualified as third highest rank among non-winners 
 Alkolil replaced Issei as fourth highest rank among non-winners 
 Fleau  replaced El Niño as fifth highest rank among non-winners
 Thomaz replaced Kareem as sixth highest rank among non-winners
 Kid Colombia replaced Sunni
Issei had originally qualified as highest rank among non-winners but was unavailable for competition. El Niño and Kareem had both qualified to Undisputed by winning Outbreak Europe and being second highest rank among non-winners respectively. However, both got injured prior to the competition. Sunni, the Notorious IBE winner, was also ruled out due to an injury.

World BBoy Series 2014
Events participating in the 2014 World BBoy Series.
The UK B-Boy Championships, UK
Freestyle Session / Pro Breaking Tour, USA
Battle of the Year, Germany
R-16 Korea, South Korea
The Notorious IBE, The Netherlands
Outbreak Europe, Slovakia
Chelles Battle Pro, France
Red Bull BC One World Finals, France

Bboys who competed for Undisputed
 Menno Chelles Battle Pro and RedBull BC One winner
 Issei R16 Korea winner
 Kleju Outbreak Europe winner
 Alkolil Battle of the Year winner
 Lilou UK Championships winner
 El Niño Freestyle Session winner
 Gravity qualified as highest rank among non-winners
 Spin replaced Tonio as second highest rank among non-winners

Tonio had originally qualified to Undisputed by winning The Notorious IBE earlier in the year. However, due to visa complications, Tonio had to withdraw from the competition. As a result, Spin will be replacing Tonio for being the second ranked among non-winners.

References

External links
R-16 Official site
UK B-Boy Championships Official site
BOTY Official site
Undisputed World Bboy Series Official site

Breakdance
Street dance competitions